Tamina Henriëtte Bartholda Jacoba Tadama-Groeneveld (1871-1938) was a Dutch painter.

Biography
Tadama-Groeneveld was born on 15 October 1871 in Utrecht, Netherlands. She studied at an art academy in Amsterdam and was also a student of George Hitchcock. She was a member of Arti et Amicitiae. In 1895 she married fellow painter Fokko Tadama with whom she had two children. Tadama emigrated to the United States without Tadama-Groeneveld.
Tadama-Groeneveld died on 3 April 1938 in Zandvoort.

Gallery

References

External links

1871 births
1938 deaths
People from Utrecht (province)
19th-century Dutch women artists
19th-century Dutch painters
20th-century Dutch women artists
20th-century Dutch painters